Fictibacillus halophilus is a moderately halophilic, Gram-positive, spore-forming and motile bacterium from the genus of Fictibacillus which has been isolated from microbial mat from a hot spring in Manikaran in India.

References

External links 

Type strain of Fictibacillus halophilus at BacDive -  the Bacterial Diversity Metadatabase

Bacillaceae
Bacteria described in 2016